T. nana may refer to:
 Trachycarpus nanus, a flowering plant species found only in China
 Turnix nanus, the black-rumped buttonquail, a bird species

Synonyms
 Taenia nana, a synonym for Hymenolepis nana, the dwarf tapeworm, a cosmopolitan cestode species that is one of the most common cestodes of humans in the world

See also
 Nana (disambiguation)